Centerville is an unincorporated community in Augusta County, Virginia, United States.

References

Unincorporated communities in Augusta County, Virginia